The Andalusian barbel  (Luciobarbus sclateri) is a freshwater fish species in the family Cyprinidae. It is here placed in Luciobarbus following the IUCN, but that genus is very closely related to the other typical barbels and perhaps better considered a mere subgenus of Barbus. The Andalusian barbel was formerly included in L. bocagei as subspecies.

L. sclateri is endemic to the southern part Iberian Peninsula, where it occurs in both Portugal and Spain. It inhabits the middle and lower parts of rivers, between the Segura's and the Mira Rivers' drainage basins. It is not very particular as regards its habitat choice, and will use anything except small cool torrential mountain streams. They spawn at the beginning of summer, between May and June. Despite its fairly small size for a barbel, it is a long-lived species, with a maximum age of 18 years having been recorded.

The Andalusian barbel is quite abundant and not considered a threatened species by the IUCN, though locally populations may go extinct during summer droughts which isolate and dry up small creeks it inhabits. Habitat fragmentation, which is already affecting the species, is exacerbated by this.

Footnotes

References
  (2008): Natural hybridization of Barbus bocagei x Barbus comizo (Cyprinidae) in Tagus River basin, central Spain [English with French abstract]. Cybium 32(2): 99-102. PDF fulltext
  (2007): Evolutionary origin of Lake Tana's (Ethiopia) small Barbus species: indications of rapid ecological divergence and speciation. Anim. Biol. 57(1): 39–48.  (HTML abstract)
 

Luciobarbus
Cyprinid fish of Europe
Endemic fish of the Iberian Peninsula
Fish described in 1868
Taxa named by Albert Günther
Taxonomy articles created by Polbot